Kim Se-jeong (born 1996) is a South Korean singer.

Kim Se-jung is a Korean name consisting of the family name Kim and the given name Se-jung, and may also refer to:

 Kim Se-jung (born 1986), birth name of the actress Ban Se-jung